Myrina sharpei, the Sharpe's fig tree blue, is a butterfly in the family Lycaenidae. It is found in the Republic of the Congo, the Democratic Republic of the Congo, Kenya, Uganda and Tanzania. The habitat consists of primary forest.

The larvae feed on Ficus capensis.

Subspecies
 Myrina sharpei sharpei (Democratic Republic of the Congo: Lualaba, Uganda, Kenya: west to the Kakamega district, north-western Tanzania)
 Myrina sharpei fontainei Stempffer, 1961 (Democratic Republic of the Congo: Uele)

References

External links
Die Gross-Schmetterlinge der Erde 13: Die Afrikanischen Tagfalter. Plate XIII 66 f

Butterflies described in 1906
Amblypodiini